Frederick Stanley (5 November 1923 – 22 October 1993) was a New Zealand cricketer. He played thirteen first-class matches for Otago between 1950 and 1954.

See also
 List of Otago representative cricketers

References

External links
 

1923 births
1993 deaths
New Zealand cricketers
Otago cricketers
Cricketers from Dunedin